Tonal is a concept within the study of Mesoamerican religion, myth, folklore and anthropology. It is a belief found in many indigenous Mesoamerican cultures that a person upon being born acquires a close spiritual link to an animal, a link that lasts throughout the lives of both creatures. The person shows signs of whatever the animal's situation to include scratches and bruises if the animals get in fights, or illness if the animal is ill. It is in this way similar to the concept of Totem.

Etymology 
The word comes from the Nahuatl word tonalli, meaning "day" or "daysign". In the Aztec belief system the day of a person's birth calculated in the Tonalpohualli would determine the nature of the person – each day was associated with an animal which could have a strong or weak aspect. The person born on the day of for example "the dog" would then have the strong or weak aspect of the dog. In Nahuatl the word Tonalli was used to refer both to a day and to the animal related to that day. In Mayan belief the concept of an animal companion of a person was referred to as "Way". The modern Mixe people refer to it as Ts'ok (Lipp 1991). The Jakaltek Maya people of Concepcion Huista, Guatemala call it yixomal ispiẍan nax, meaning "soul bearer".

Studies 
The study of tonalism was initiated by noted archaeologist, linguist and ethnologist Daniel Garrison Brinton who published a treatise called "Nagualism: A Study in Native-American Folklore and History" which chronicled historical interpretations of the word and those who practiced nagualism in Mexico in 1894. He identified the different beliefs associated with tonalism in some modern Mexican communities such as the Mixe, the Nahuas, the Zapotecs and Mixtecs. Precursors of these practices extend to ancient indigenous civilizations such as Nahua, Olmec and Toltec civilizations.

See also 
Nagual
Wayob

References 

Brinton, Daniel g, 1894, "Nagualism: A Study in Native-American Folklore and History".
Kaplan, Lucille, 1956, "Tonal and Nagual in Coastal Oaxaca", Journal of American Folklore 69:363-368
Lipp, Frank J,  1991, The Mixe of Oaxaca: Religion, ritual and healing, University of Texas Press
 Stratmeyer, Dennis & Jean, 1977, "The Jacaltec Nawal and the Soul Bearer in Concepcion Huista", in Cognitive Studies of Southern Mesoamerica, Helen L. Neuenschander and Dean E. Arnold eds., Summer Institute of Linguistics, Museum of Anthropology Publication 3.

Shamanism of the Americas
Neoshamanism
Aztec mythology and religion
Maya mythology and religion
Guatemalan folklore
Animals in mythology
Animals in religion